Lake Winnipeg has many islands:

Adams Island
Bakers Island
Bannock Island
Berens Island
Berry Island
Big Sturgeon Island
Black Island (part of Hecla-Grindstone Provincial Park)
Black Fox Island
Birch Islands
Burnt Island
Burton Island
Cairine Island (part of Hecla-Grindstone Provincial Park)
Canoe Pass Island
Chief Island
Cochrane Island
Commissioner Island
Cox Island
Deer Island (part of Hecla-Grindstone Provincial Park])
Denetts Island
Devil's Island
Dog Island
Eagle Island
Egg Islands
Elk Island
Floating Island
George Island
Goldeye Island
Goose Island (part of Hecla-Grindstone Provincial Park)
Gull Island
Hecla Island (Lake Winnipeg) (part of Hecla-Grindstone Provincial Park)
Horse Island (Lake Winnipeg)
Horseshoe Island
Inner Sturgeon Island
Jackhead Island
Johns Island
Kasakeemeemisekak Islands (part of Hecla-Grindstone Provincial Park)
Little Eagle Island
Little George Island
Little Moose Island
Little Punk Island (part of Hecla-Grindstone Provincial Park)
Little Sturgeon Island
Little Tamarack Island
Little Willow Island
Long Island
Matheson Island
McLeods Island
Moose Island
North Sandhill Island
Nut Island
Pelican Island
Plunkett Island
Pony Island
Punk Island (part of Hecla-Grindstone Provincial Park)
Reindeer Island
Round Island
Sandhill Island
Sandy Islands
Big Sandy Island
Cannibal Island (Lake Winnipeg)
Little Sandy Island
Shoal Islands
Spider Islands
St. Martin Islands
Tamarack Island
Tree Island
Twin Islands

Lake Winnipeg
 
Islands